

The Puck Building is a historic building located in the Nolita neighborhood of Manhattan, New York City. It occupies the block bounded by Lafayette, Houston, Mulberry and Jersey Streets.

An example of the German Rundbogenstil style of architecture, the building was designed by Albert Wagner, and was constructed in two parts. The north section was built in 1885–86, and the south addition in 1892–93. The front of the building – on Lafayette Street – was relocated in 1899 when the street – then called Elm Place – was widened, this was supervised by Herman Wagner. The building was rehabilitated in 1983–84 and further renovated in 1995 by Beyer Blinder Belle. The building sports two gilded statues by sculptor Henry Baerer of Shakespeare's character Puck, from A Midsummer Night's Dream, one on the northeast corner at Houston and Mulberry, and one over the main entrance on Lafayette.

The building is located at the northwestern corner of Manhattan's NoLIta neighborhood, bordered by SoHo and the NoHo section of Greenwich Village. It is owned by Kushner Properties, the company of Charles Kushner and his son Jared Kushner, son-in-law of former United States President Donald Trump.

History

The building was constructed as the printing facility of J. Ottmann Lithographic Company as a seven-story structure, with a nine-story structure added on in 1892.

The building was the longtime home of Puck magazine, which gave the building its name; Founded in St. Louis in 1871, the magazine moved into the building in 1887 and remained there until it ceased publication in 1918.

A June 1887 fire caused significant damage, estimated as high as $30,000, including water damage to Puck magazine's editorial rooms. A fire in November caused $50,000 in damage after a can of turpentine caught on fire inside a finishing room where workers were producing Christmas cards.

The building later housed numerous independent printing firms and related printing services such as typesetters and a printing ink company, Superior Printing Ink. The odor of printing ink permeated the building for many years. An office stationery company, S. Novick & Son, once occupied the second floor. Notable among that firm's salesmen was Alger Hiss, the former Assistant Secretary of State, who was brought down in a spy scandal in the 1950s.

The Serra family bought the building in 1978 and allowed the building to empty out as tenants left over the years as their leases expired. A proposed 1981 conversion of the building eliminated the inclusion of residential space based on the economics of paying displaced commercial tenants a fee of $9 per square foot. The building reopened in April 1983 after an $8 million renovation and restoration project that created condominium spaces for businesses primarily related to the arts.

On November 5, 1982, author and artist Theresa Hak Kyung Cha was raped and killed by security guard and serial rapist Joey Sanza in The Puck Building. Cha had gone there to meet her husband, photographer Richard Barnes, who was documenting the renovation of the building. Cha died a week after the publication of her book Dictee. Sanza was convicted after five years and three trials.

Owner Jared Kushner sought approval from the Landmarks Preservation Commission to erect six penthouse apartments at the top of the red-brick building. After initially being turned down in October 2011, Kushner made two modifications and his plans were approved. The first of the six units closed in May 2014, selling for $28 million.

Tenants
In the 1980s, the Puck Building was the original home of Spy Magazine. Starting in 1986, the building housed the Manhattan Center of Pratt Institute. Pratt used the additional space for computer and technical labs for the School of Computer, Information, and Library Science (SCILS).

Since 2004, the building has been used by New York University for the Wagner Graduate School of Public Service and the department of sociology.

The building contains both office and retail space as well as ballrooms for large events on both the top and ground floors. The Skylight Ballroom can accommodate 250 guests, while the Grand Ballroom can fit up to 1,000.

The retail space was added when the building underwent a large-scale renovation beginning in October 2011.

In 2011, REI opened a  store spanning the building's first three levels. The renovation was designed by architects Callison and includes an area that showcases the history of the Puck Building.

Thrive Capital, the venture capital firm run by Charles Kushner's son and Jared Kushner's younger brother Josh, has its office in the building. Several portfolio companies in which Thrive is invested are also headquartered in the Puck Building, including Cadre and Oscar.

In popular culture
During Little Italy's annual Feast of San Gennaro, which takes place on Mulberry Street, strings of lights are strung from the building's Mulberry Street walls.
An exterior shot of the Puck Building is seen in the American television sitcom Will & Grace, as the building where the title character Grace Adler (played by Debra Messing) works.
An exterior shot of the Puck Building was seen on the American television Seinfeld in the episode "The Little Kicks", when Elaine hosts a company party there.
In the 1989 film When Harry Met Sally..., the building is the site of a big fight between Harry (Billy Crystal) and Sally (Meg Ryan) during the wedding of their best friends Marie (Carrie Fisher) and Jess (Bruno Kirby), as well as the site of a New Year's Eve party at the end of the film where Harry says that he loves Sally.
The final scene of the 1989 Kevin Kline film January Man was shot at the Puck Building, featuring both interior and exterior shots.
The Puck Building serves as the venue for a black-tie party in the 1991 Bret Easton Ellis novel American Psycho.
The music video of The Alan Parsons Project's song "Stereotomy" was filmed inside the Puck Building. The video was directed by Zbigniew Rybczyński.
The building is used as the fictional setting for Grace Adler Designs, workplace of Grace Adler from the TV sitcom  Will and Grace.

References

External links

The Puck Building (caterer's commercial site)
Puck Building on New York Architecture

Buildings and structures on the National Register of Historic Places in Manhattan
Kushner family
Industrial buildings completed in 1893
New York City Designated Landmarks in Manhattan
New York University
Office buildings in Manhattan
Renaissance Revival architecture in New York City
Nolita